Alexander Scott (1920–1989) was a Scottish poet, playwright and scholar born in Aberdeen. He wrote poetry in both Scots and Scottish English as well as plays, literary reviews and critical studies of literature. As a writer, scholar, dramatist, broadcaster, critic and editor, he showed a life-long commitment to Scottish literary culture. He was latterly a tutor and reader of Scottish literature at the University of Glasgow, where he was instrumental in establishing Scotland's first Department of Scottish Literature in the academic year 1971–72.

In 1972, Scott was one of the founders of the Lallans Society (later the Scots Language Society).  He was a member of its committee from the outset and served as Preses from 1974 to 1977 and from 1979 to 1983. He also served as president of the Association for Scottish Literary Studies from 1976 to 1979. In 1985 he succeeded Robert McLellan as Honorary Preses.

In 1983, Scott became a founding editor of the periodical New Writing Scotland.

Works

Books
Selected Poems, Saltire Modern Poets series, Oliver and Boyd, Edinburgh, 1950
Still Life: William Soutar, 1898 - 1943, Chambers, 1958
The MacDiarmid Makars, 1923 - 1972, Akros Publications, 1972
Double Agent: Poems in English and Scots, Akros Publications, 1972
Neil M. Gunn: The Man and the Writer (contributing editor), Blackwood, Edinburgh, 1973, 
Selected Poems, 1943 - 1974, Akros Publications, 1975
Modern Scots Verse 1922 - 1977 (Editor), Akros Publications, 1978
Scotch Passion: An Anthology of Scottish Erotic Poetry (Editor), Robert Hale, 1982
Voices of Our Kind: An Anthology of Modern Scottish Poetry from 1920 to the Present (Editor), Larousse Kingfisher Chambers, 1987
The Comic Poems of William Tennant (Editor), Association for Scottish Literary Studies, 1989
Sing Frae the Hert: The Literary Criticism of Alexander Scott (edited by Neil R. MacCallum), Scottish Cultural Press, 1996,

Articles
Edwin Morgan: Experimenter Extraordinary, in Lindsay, Maurice (ed.), The Scottish Review: Arts and Environment 28, November 1982, pp. 22 – 26, 
Pink Elephants in Anstruther: Scottish Identity, in Lindsay, Maurice (ed.), The Scottish Review: Arts and Environment 33, February 1984, pp. 3 – 8,

Reviews
 Campbell, Ian (1975), review of Selected Poems, 1943 - 1974, in Burnett, Ray (ed.), Calgacus No. 3, Spring 1976, pp. 54 – 56,

References

External links
International journal of Scottish literature review of David Robb's biography of Alexander Scott.
J Derrick McClure, online biography of Alexander Scott

1920 births
1989 deaths
20th-century Scottish poets
Scottish male poets
20th-century British male writers